Estadio Alfredo Harp Helú (English: Alfredo Harp Helú Stadium) is the home baseball stadium of the Red Devils of Mexico (Diablos Rojos del México) in Mexico City, inaugurated on March 23, 2019. With a capacity of 20,576 seats, it became the first stadium built in the city in the last 50 years.

In December 2019, Major League Baseball (MLB) announced it would be staging a two-game series at the stadium in April 2020 between the San Diego Padres and the Arizona Diamondbacks, which was later cancelled due to the COVID-19 outbreak.

In August 2022, MLB announced it would hold a two-game series at the stadium on April 29 and 30, 2023 between the San Diego Padres and the San Francisco Giants. These will be the first regular season MLB games in Mexico City.

Background 
After the demolition of the Parque del Seguro Social in 2000, former baseball park of Diablos Rojos del México and Tigres de Quintana Roo, the red team was forced to find refuge at El Foro Sol to host their local games of Mexican Baseball League (Liga Mexicana de Beisbol). Opened as a baseball park on June 2, 2000, with the second game of the series between Tigres de Quintana Roo and Diablos Rojos del México; "Los Escarlatas" found, momentarily, a stadium that would serve as its own stage until September 11, 2014.

The announcement of the construction of a new baseball stadium by Alfredo Harp Helú, in 2010, Diablos Rojos del México had to leave the Foro Sol in 2014 due to the return of the Mexico City Grand Prix of Formula 1; using as a temporary stay the small, functional and familiar Estadio Fray Nano (2014-2018).

With the start of construction of the Estadio Alfredo Harp Helú in November 2015, built between turns 1 and 3 of the Autódromo Hermanos Rodríguez, in the famous Magdalena Mixhuca Sports City in Mexico City. The conclusion of the project would mean the first professional stadium built after 50 years, in the city.

The beginning of the project started from the promise of Alfredo Harp Helú, more than 20 years ago, focused on creating a permanent home to the fans and the institution itself; accomplish not only his dream of having a stadium of their own for Diablos Rojos del México, but also making real a promise based on the love and passion for baseball and Mexico.

Opening 
The inauguration was attended by President Andrés Manuel López Obrador and the Mayor Claudia Sheinbaum. The ceremony was the first time that the President of Mexico had thrown the "first pitch" in a baseball park since 1947, when Miguel Alemán did so. The starting pitchers were Arturo López for the Diablos and Ryan Weathers for the Padres. The San Diego Padres won the game by a score of 11–2.

References

External links 
 Official website

Baseball venues in Mexico
Sports venues in Mexico City
Mexican League ballparks
Sports venues completed in 2019
2019 establishments in Mexico